Ellen D. Williams is an American theatre and TV actress.

Life and career
Williams graduated with a bachelor's degree in Theatre Arts from California State University, Long Beach.

In 2011, Williams was cast and is best known for her role in How I Met Your Mother, portraying Patrice. Since then she has appeared in such shows as The Mindy Project, Life in Pieces, Criminal Minds, The Real O'Neals, Pitch, Kevin from Work, to name a few. In 2016, Williams started recurring opposite Zach Galifianakis in the FX show, Baskets, as Nicole Baskets.

In 2016, Williams starred opposite Ginger Gonzaga and Jason Ritter in Gonzaga's short film, Your Day.

Williams is an actress who has appeared in numerous theatre productions in the Los Angeles and Seattle areas.  Working with such companies in Los Angeles as Playwrights Arena at LATC, East West Players, South Coast Repertory, LoudRMouth, The Garage Theatre Company, to name a few.  She garnered a "Leading Female Performance" nomination from LA Weekly in 2009 for her role as Ruby in Boni B. Alvarez's play Ruby, Tragically Rotund.

Personal life
Her mother is of Filipino, Chinese, and Spanish descent, and her father is of English, Irish, Scottish descent.
Williams is openly gay.

Filmography

References

External links

Living people
American actresses of Filipino descent
California State University, Long Beach alumni
Actresses from Santa Monica, California
American television actresses
LGBT people from California
American lesbian actresses
21st-century American actresses
American film actresses
Year of birth missing (living people)
American LGBT people of Asian descent